Witless may refer to:

Media 
 Witless (TV series) 2016 BBC series
 "Witless", 1986 television episode, see list of Sledge Hammer! episodes
 "Witless", 1999 television episode, see list of Johnny Bravo episodes

See also 
 Witless Bay, town on the Avalon Peninsula, Canada